The Jesse Stuart Memorial Bridge is a viaduct bridge on top of the Greenup Lock and Dam on the Ohio River.  The bridge, named after author and Greenup County, Kentucky native Jesse Stuart, was completed in 1984 and carries Kentucky Route 10 (unsigned) from the AA Highway/U.S. Route 23 intersection to the bridge itself, where it becomes State Route 253 to U.S. Route 52. The Ohio approach has a ramp to a rest area operated by the Ohio Department of Transportation. There is also a park on the Kentucky side of the bridge, which is open for fishing and recreation.  This park is operated by the United States Army Corps of Engineers. Both facilities, and the bridge itself, were briefly closed after the September 11 attacks due to terrorism concerns since they are all part of the Greenup Locks and Dam complex. They have since reopened; however, access to the observation platforms on both sides of the dam is no longer permitted.

See also
List of crossings of the Ohio River
Greenup Lock and Dam

External links
 Jesse Stuart Memorial Bridge at Bridges & Tunnels

Road bridges in Ohio
Bridges over the Ohio River
Bridges in Greenup County, Kentucky
Transportation in Scioto County, Ohio
Bridges completed in 1984
Bridges in Appalachia
Buildings and structures in Scioto County, Ohio
Road bridges in Kentucky